Liisi Kivioja (10 January 1859 – 30 October 1925) was a Finnish educator, politician and banker. A member of the Finnish Party, she was elected to Parliament in 1907 as one of the first group of female MPs, remaining in parliament until 1910.

Biography
Kivioja was born in Siikajoki in 1859. She worked as a primary school teacher in Vähäkyrö in 1881 and 1882, and then in Oulunsalo between 1882 and 1888. She married Aapeli Kivioja in 1888, and the couple lived in the United States between 1891 and 1897. She returned to Finland and worked as a housekeeper and primary school teacher.

As a member of the Finnish Party, Kivioja contested the 1907 elections and was one of 19 women elected to parliament. She was re-elected in 1908 and 1909, serving until February 1910. During her time in parliament she sat on the Grand Committee, the Municipal Committee and the Committee on Workers' Affairs.

After leaving parliament, she served as director of a trade school for elderly blind people in Kuopio between 1910 and 1918, and then managed the Kalajoki branch of the Kansallis-Osake-Pankki until her death in 1925.

References

1859 births
1925 deaths
People from Siikajoki
People from Oulu Province (Grand Duchy of Finland)
Finnish Party politicians
Members of the Parliament of Finland (1907–08)
Members of the Parliament of Finland (1908–09)
Members of the Parliament of Finland (1909–10)
Finnish schoolteachers
Finnish expatriates in the United States
Women members of the Parliament of Finland
Finnish bankers
20th-century Finnish women politicians